SHY is an Italian owned fashion label specialising in women's shoes and handbags. It was founded in Riviera del Brenta, Venice in 2001. SHY are considered high fashion and have very few stores, all of which are within Europe. SHY gained much attention in the fashion world by being featured in Vogue magazine in March, 2005.

Stores

SHY have one flagship store, in Crocus City Mall, Moscow. The main showroom is on the commercial road of Via Marcona in Milan. Outside Italy, SHY shoes can be found in high end fashion stores such as Maryon's in Australia, Tracey Ross in the USA, Joyce in Hong Kong and La Scarpa in Istanbul. They often have a stand at upmarket shoe events such as the Micam Shoe-event in Milan in 2006, also having season long exhibitions at cities such as Paris and Milan.

Collections

SHY release a new themed collection twice a year, one for spring/summer and one for fall/winter. The collections often revolve around a central theme such as bright colours or metal, and the collection usually contains different styles of shoe such as stilettos, sandals, boots and usually have a similarly styled handbag. In each collection, there are different themed sets, each one consisting of 6-8 different shoes and 2-3 handbags. At the SHY store and high end retailers, the shoes retail at over €400 (£270) and the handbags retail at over €500 (£340).

See also 
 List of Italian companies

References

External links
 Shycollection.com
 1st floor, SHY's Milan showroom

Clothing companies of Italy
Clothing companies established in 2001
Shoe brands